The following article lists notable events during the 1895–96 season in American soccer.

Changes from 1894–95 

Most notably, the American League of Professional Football disbanded after playing one season. The ALPF was a winter soccer league organized by baseball owners of the National League of Professional Baseball Clubs. The goal of this league was to maintain brand relevance of their existing baseball clubs during the offseason, and to attract extra funds during the late fall and winter months.

Subsequently, the National Association Football League conducted its first season this year, having four teams play in the inaugural season. A fifth team, New Rochelle F.C., failed to start the season.

Honors and achievements 

Notes = Number in parentheses is the times that club has won that honor. * indicates new record for competition

League standings

NAFBL 

The final table of the 1895 NAFBL season.

American Cup

1895 American Cup 

 Winner: Newark Caledonian
 Finalist: Pawtucket Free Wanderers

1896 American Cup 
 Winner: Paterson True Blues
 Finalist: Fall River Olympics

References 

 
1894-95